Tafsir Nemooneh (literally "The Ideal Commentary") is a tafsir (exegesis on the Quran) written by Naser Makarem Shirazi and other authors working under his supervision in 27 volumes. The commentators are said to have targeted the contemporary era and the related social issues.

The work is originally written in Persian, but it has been translated into other languages, including Arabic ( al-Amthal fi Tafsir al-Qur'an), English, and Urdu.

The authors under supervision of Makarem Shirazi include Mohammad-Reza Ashtiani, Mohammad-Ja'far Emami, Davood Elhami, Asadollah Imani, Abdol-Rasul Hassani, Seyyed Hassan Shoja'i Kiyasari, Seyyed Nurollah Tabataba'i, Mahmoud Abdollahi, Mohsen Qera'ati, and Mohammad Mohammadi Eshtehardi.

External links 
 Tafseer e Namona Read-Online
 Tafseed e Namoon PDF Download (27 Volumes)

References 

Shia tafsir
Iranian books
Arabic-language books
Urdu-language books